The 2007 Mississippi State Bulldogs football team represented Mississippi State University during the 2007 NCAA Division I FBS football season. The team's head coach was Sylvester Croom, who served his fourth season in the position. The Bulldogs played their six home games in 2007 at Davis Wade Stadium in Starkville, Mississippi.

The Bulldogs' record of 8–5 (4–4 in the SEC) was MSU's first winning record since the 2000 season, when the team finished 8–4 (4–4 in conference). The 'Dogs earned their first bowl game berth since 2000 by reaching the 2007 Liberty Bowl.  Mississippi State's victory there over Conference USA champion Central Florida also marked MSU's first bowl victory since 2000, when the Bulldogs defeated Texas A&M, 43–41 in overtime, to win the 2000 Independence Bowl under head coach Jackie Sherrill. For the Bulldogs' improvement, Croom was voted the 2007 SEC Coach of the Year by his peers.

Pre-season
At the 2007 SEC Football Media Days in Hoover, Alabama, Mississippi State was predicted to finish 6th in the SEC Western Division, based on a poll of SEC coaches.

2006 season in review
The Bulldogs finished the 2006 college football season with a dismal 3–9 record (1–7 conference). MSU's only wins came over UAB (16–10, overtime) of Conference USA in Birmingham and DI-AA/FCS opponent Jacksonville State (35–3), with the Bulldogs' lone conference victory coming over Alabama in Tuscaloosa, a game in which MSU was a 14-point underdog, by a 24–16 margin, snapping a streak of 23 consecutive conference road losses for MSU.

Despite their poor record, Croom's squad showed signs of improvement in 2006: they were outgained by just 51.9 yards per game, fewer than conference foes Ole Miss and Kentucky, who won the 2006 Music City Bowl; in their 24–27 loss at Georgia, they reached UGA's 31-yard line but lost a fumble with 0:03 remaining in the game; they outgained Arkansas, the 2006 SEC West Champs, by 99 yards in a 14–28 loss; and the Bulldogs also lost close games to Tulane (29–32), Kentucky (31–34) and rival Ole Miss in the 2006 Battle for the Golden Egg (17–20).

With 17 returning starters (10 offense, 5 defense, Kicker, Punter) in 2007, the Bulldogs will expect to see statistical improvement paying off in the Win/Loss column in "Sly" Croom's contract year.

Players departing
Seven starters departed from States' 2006 squad. All of them were seniors whose eligibility expired:

RG Brian Anderson, 6'6", 300 lbs., Three-year starter (started all 12 games in 2006)
LB Quinton Culberson, 6'1", 236 lbs., All-SEC First-Team (102 tackles, 8 TFLs, 1 sack, 6 passes defended, 2 INTs in 2006)
RCB David Heard, 6'0", 192 lbs., Three year starter (45 tackles, 3 TFLs, 8 passes defended, 2 INTs in 2006)
DE Michael Heard, 6'2", 259 lbs., (37 tackles, 4.5 TFLs, 6.5 sacks in 2006)
S Jeramie Johnson, 5'11", 213 lbs., (72 tackles, 3 TFLs, 5 passes defended in 2006)
DT/LB Anwar Phillips, 6'0", 258 lbs.,
DT Andrew Powell, 6'1", 290 lbs., (34 tackles, 1.5 TFLs, .5 sack in 2006)
DT Deljuan Robinson, 6'3", 287 lbs., (34 tackles, 11 TFLs, 1.5 sacks in 2006)

Also departed are Seniors Omar Conner, who completed 76 of 135 passes (56.3%) for 943 yards and three touchdowns (three interceptions), rushed 37 times for 101 yards (2.7 average) and two touchdowns, and caught eight passes for 70 yards while splitting time at WR and QB, WR Will Prosser (11 receptions, 135 yards) and DT Antonio Johnson (21 tackles, 4 TFLs), who was selected by the Tennessee Titans with the 152nd pick of the 2007 NFL Draft.

Players returning
Despite the loss of several standout veteran players from the Bulldogs' 2006 squad, the 2007 Bulldogs boast an experienced lineup, including 17 returning starters.

Offense
State's offense in 2007 includes ten returning starters from 2006 (in bold).

Under center, Junior Michael Henig will get the first look at QB for the 'Dogs' after starting six games and completing 74 of 169 pass attempts (43.8%) for 1201 yards and seven touchdowns (nine interceptions) as a Sophomore in 2006. He will be challenged by Sophomores Ty Evans and Zack Harrington as well as incoming JUCO transfer Josh Riddell.

The Bulldogs will get back their top five pass receivers from 2006: Tony Burks (35 catches, 850 yards, 5 touchdowns, led SEC with 24.3 yards per reception), Jamayel Smith (20 receptions, 335 yards, 2 touchdowns), TE Eric Butler (13 receptions, 210 yards, 1 touchdown), Lance Long (25 receptions, 177 yards, 1 touchdown) and Aubrey Bell (8 receptions, 151 yards). Also returning are backup TEs Dezmond Sherrod (just 7 career receptions, but a solid blocking TE) and Jason Husband (9 receptions, 89 yards, 1 touchdown in 2006).

Sophomore RB Anthony Dixon emerged as a star in his 2006 true-Freshman season, rushing 169 times for 668 yards (4 yards per carry) and 9 touchdowns. He looks to handle the 'Dogs' starting RB duties again in 2007. Backups Arnil Stallworth, Justin Williams and Christian Ducré all return, as well. Juniors Eric Hoskins, who redshirted in 2006 after transferring from Holmes, and Brandon Hart, a converted RB, will share the FB duties.

The Bulldogs have the makings of a solid group of linemen up front, where C Royce Blacledge returns to anchor the unit in his Senior season after starting every game there as a Junior in 2006; Sophomore Craig Jenkins, who started every game at RT in 2006, moves to RG; Juniors Anthony Strauder and Michael Gates, who split time at LG both return, as do talented Junior Michael Brown, who transferred to State after redshirting at Florida, and Senior swing G/T J.D. Hamilton, both of whom split time at LT last season.

 Offensive Depth (as of December 29, 2007)

 "Fr." refers to true freshmen who are in their first season on-campus, unless noted "RS" in which case the player is participating in their first season of eligibility after red-shirting.

Defense
Despite the loss of six starters from 2006, Mississippi State returns five proven, veteran starters (in bold) and a strong group of young players who will attempt to replace last year's Seniors.

Up front, Senior LDE Titus Brown (38 tackles, 7 TFLs, 7.5 sacks, 1 pass defended in 2006), a 2006 Second-Team All-SEC selection, is the only returning starter, but with 18 career starts under his belt, he has the experience to be a disruptive force for the Bulldogs and to help develop his younger teammates.  Senior Avery Hannibal looks to fill the other DE spot, after recording eight tackles, one TFL and one sack in spot-relief of departed Senior Michael Heard in 2006. RS Freshman Brandon Cooper and Juniors Charles Burns and Tim Bailey, a former JUCO star and Army National Guard veteran, can also be expected to compete for time at DE, as well as JUCO newcomer Jimmie Holmes. With all three players who split time at DT in 2006 gone, competition for both starting jobs looks to be wide open. Freshman Reggie Odom, Sophomores Quinton Wesley and Kyle Love (7 tackles in 2006) and Junior Cortez McCraney (10 tackles, 1.5 TFL in 2005) will all have chances to earn the vacant spots, but they will be challenged by newcomers like JUCO transfer Jessie Bowman and true-Freshman LaMarcus Williams.

At LB, Senior Gabe O'Neal (40 tackles, 3 TFL in 2006) and Junior Jamar Chaney (66 tackles, 5 TFL, 2.5 sacks) seem to have what it takes to maintain the respective starting SLB and MLB spots that they occupied in 2006. Sophomore Jamon Hughes (17 tackles) and Junior Anthony Littlejohn (12 tackles, 1 pass defended) look to be the top contenders to earn the final WLB spot, along with JUCO transfer Dominic Douglas.

In the secondary, Mississippi State returns two Junior defensive stars in SS Keith Fitzhugh (59 tackles, .5 TFL, 3 passes defended, 1 INT in 2006) and 2006 Second-Team All-SEC selection Derek Pegues (32 tackles, 1.5 TFL, 5 passes defended, 4 INTs), who will move from CB to FS. Sophomores Anthony Johnson (12 tackles, 1 pass defended) and Marcus Washington (6 tackles) will compete for the vacated CB spots, along with Juniors Demario Bobo (65 tackles, 2 TFLs, 2 FFs, 2 passes defended from 2004–2005) and Keon Humphries, a converted WR, and JUCO transfers Jasper O'Quinn and Chris Nance.

 Defensive Depth (as of December 29, 2007)

Special teams
Mississippi State returns virtually all of its key players in the kicking game (returning staters in bold).

Junior K Adam Carlson (8 of 16 career FGs, 58 career points, 47 career long) is back after his first full season as a starter. Carlson will also handle kickoff duties for the second straight year. In 2006, he kicked off 31 times for an average of 54.2 yards. Also, returning is Junior P Blake McAdams, who averaged 38.2 yards per kick and landed 15 of his 68 punts inside opponents' 20. Derek Pegues will again handle punt and kick returning duties after returning 25 punts an average of 14 yards with one touchdown and taking back 29 kickoffs an average of 23.7 yards in 2006.

 Special Teams Depth (as of December 29, 2007)

Newcomers: 2007 signing class
MSU signed a total of 34 players to letters of intent, comprising the Bulldogs' 2007 signing class.  The class was headlined by a large number of top in-state high school recruits including RB/S Marcus Green (Meridian), DT Quentin Saulsberry (Independence), OT Derek Sherrod (Caledonia) and highly touted RB Robert Elliot (Okolona), who chose the Bulldogs on National Signing Day following a heated recruiting battle between MSU, Ole Miss and Florida State. The Bulldogs capped off a solid 2007 high school class with several top junior college signees, such as DT Jessie Bowman (Brookhaven/Co-Lin) and WR Co-Eric Riley (Lucedale/Gulf Coast). Additionally, MSU signed several strong out-of-State players including high school DT LaMarcus Williams (Bastrop, Louisiana) and JUCO QB Josh Riddell (Salem, Oregon/Foothill). Rivals.com ranked State's 2007 class 39th in the Nation, while Scout.com had the Bulldogs' class at 27th. With a strong, consensus top-40 class, the Bulldogs will expect and need some newcomers to make an immediate impact on the field.

 (TR) indicates signees who are transferring to MSU from another collegiate institution and therefore have only two seasons of NCAA eligibility remaining, instead of the standard four.
 Although Mississippi State signed 34 players in their 2007 class, the Bulldogs had only 26 football scholarships available to offer for the 2007 season (a situation referred to as "oversigning"). Signees who do not appear on MSU's 2007 roster due to oversigning, failure to qualify academically or any other reason are noted with an asterisk *.

Schedule
Analyst Phil Steele ranked MSU's 2007 schedule strength 29th in the Nation in his 2007 preview magazine.

 Rankings indicate opponent's position in AP Poll as released week prior to game.

Game summaries

LSU
Last Meeting: September 30, 2006, L 17–48Series Record: MSU trails 33–64–3

LSU and Mississippi State kicked off the 2007 college football season in a Thursday night SEC contest broadcast live on ESPN, the 101st meeting between the two teams.  Through much of the first half it appeared as though Mississippi State was up to the daunting task of challenging the Tigers, then the #2-ranked team in the country behind only USC, as MSU clung to a 0–3 deficit through most of the first half, until LSU scored 14 points in the last six minutes of the second quarter, opening the door for the Tigers to cruise to the final 0–45 margin.

LSU K Colt David warmed up the scoreboard for the Tigers' offense with a 27-yard field goal in the first quarter. Tigers' RB Keiland Williams scored twice on one-yard touchdown runs in the second quarter to push LSU's lead to 0–17 at the half.

In the third quarter, the Tigers' distanced themselves with two eleven-yard touchdown passes from QB Matt Flynn, one to WR Early Doucet and the other to RB Charles Scott, bringing the score to 0–31 to start the fourth quarter. LSU backup QB Ryan Perriloux sealed the Tigers' victory in the fourth quarter with a three-yard touchdown scramble, followed by a 15-yard touchdown pass to WR Brandon LaFell to put LSU up by the final 0–45 margin.

LSU's dominance included earning 22 first downs to MSU's nine and yielding MSU just ten rushing yards on 26 carries. LSU FB Jacob Hester led the Tigers with 14 carries for 72 yards (4.9 yards per carry), while Early Doucet paced LSU's passing attack with 9 catches for 78 yards, including the 11-yard touchdown strike he caught in the third quarter; he was the only LSU receiver to catch more than one pass. For MSU, RB Anthony Dixon led the Bulldogs on the ground with just 29 yards on 13 carries (2.2 average). RB Arnil Stallworth led MSU with only 3 pass receptions for 33 yards.

LSU starting QB Matt Flynn paced his team's offense by completing 12 of 19 passes for 128 yards and two touchdowns and rushing 11 times for 42 yards. Ryan Perriloux ran the Tigers' offense well in relief duty, completing 2 of 3 passes for 21 yards and a touchdown and running 3 times for 12 yards and another score. For MSU, QB Michael Henig completed just 11 of 28 passes on his way to a school record-tying six interception-performance. He was sacked three times for a cumulative loss of 30 yards.

Defensively, LSU LB Ali Highsmith led the Tigers with eight total tackles. Tigers' S Craig Steltz returned three of MSU's six interceptions a total of 100 yards. MSU LB Dominic Douglas, playing in his first career game with the Bulldogs, led all tacklers with nine total, earning "Outstanding Performer" recognition for Week 1.

LSU went on to finish the season 12–2 with a victory over Ohio State in the BCS title game and were ranked #1 in all final major polls.

Tulane
Last Meeting: September 16, 2006, L 29-32Series Record: MSU leads 29-26-2

After being hammered 0–45 by LSU to open the season, MSU sought its first win of 2007 when the Bulldogs traveled to New Orleans to take on another team from the state of Louisiana, the Tulane Green Wave, in the second week of the season. As with all Tulane home games, the contest was played at the Louisiana Superdome, also the home stadium of the New Orleans Saints. The game was also a homecoming of sorts for MSU RB Christian Ducré, a native of nearby Mandeville who began his college career at Tulane before transferring to State.

Coming into the game, Tulane's All-C-USA RB Matt Forte was regarded as one of the nation's best Running Backs. A 2008 NFL Draft prospect, Forte finished the 2007 season by earning AP All-America recognition.

State started the scoring off early in the first quarter, when LB Gabe O'Neal intercepted a pass on the first offensive series of the game and returned it 47 yards for a touchdown. Tulane responded on the next series, however, with a quick three-play, 61-yard drive resulting in a 39-yard touchdown run by Forte. Mississippi State added an 18-yard touchdown run by QB Michael Henig and Tulane tacked on an eight-yard touchdown pass from QB Scott Elliott to FB Jeremy McKinney, all in the first quarter. The only other scoring in the first half came when MSU and Tulane traded field goals in the second quarter, a 23-yarder by Adam Carlson and a 26-yarder by Ross Thevenot, respectively, leaving the score tied 17–17 at halftime.

After the competitive first half, Mississippi State regrouped and the Bulldogs took the game over in the second by scoring 21 unanswered points. FB Jeremy Jones capped off a long drive to open the second half, catching an eight-yard touchdown pass from Michael Henig after MSU's offense covered 67 yards with 9 plays in 3:30. Later in the third quarter, RB Anthony Dixon broke a 27-yard run to stretch the 'Dogs' lead to 14. Dixon sealed the victory for MSU with a seven-yard fourth quarter run that put the Bulldogs ahead by the final margin.

Dixon bounced back from being shut down by LSU in the previous week by rushing for 131 yards on 27 carries (4.9 average) and two touchdowns, earning him "Outstanding Performer" recognition for Week 2. QB Michael Henig posted an admirable performance as well, completing 21 of 30 pass attempts for 223 yards with a touchdown and an interception.

Meanwhile, MSU's defense put up an impressive performance, allowing the Green Wave only eight first downs to MSU's 27 and limiting Forte to 63 yards on 14 carries (3.4 average), his lowest totals of the 2007 season in all three categories. He also lost two fumbles to the 'Dogs' defense.

LB Jamar Chaney led MSU with six total tackles. In addition to his interception return for a touchdown, LB Gabe O'Neal recovered a fumble and recorded four total tackles and was named the SEC's Defensive Player of the Week for Week 2.

Tulane finished the season with an unimpressive 4-8 record, but did manage to finish in third place in the C-USA West.

Auburn
Last Meeting: September 9, 2006, L 0–34Series Record: MSU trails 22–56–2

MSU traveled to Auburn, Alabama for their Week 3 match-up against the favored Auburn Tigers, played at Jordan–Hare Stadium. The Tigers boasted a six-game win streak against the Bulldogs dating back to 2001. Since the 'Dogs defeated the Tigers 17–10 in Starkville in 2000, Auburn had dominated over the course of their six consecutive wins against MSU, outscoring State by an average margin of 25.5 points, including consecutive shutouts in 2005 and 2006.

State (1–1, 0–1) entered the game coming off of an impressive second half rally to cruise by Tulane after their opening week-beating at the hands of LSU. Auburn (1–1, 0–0) had fallen from the national polls by losing to then-unranked South Florida in Week 2, after defeating the Kansas State Wildcats with a 14-point fourth quarter rally in the opening week of the season.

The Bulldogs caught AU off guard, jumping out to a 13–0 lead early in the second quarter. MSU K Adam Carlson scored State's first points with a 32-yard field goal on the game's opening drive, marking the first time MSU had scored on Auburn since 2004. On the next drive, Auburn's first of the game, Tigers' QB Brandon Cox threw an interception caught and returned by MSU FS Derek Pegues for a touchdown less than a minute after Carlson's field goal to give MSU a quick 10–0 lead. Cox again threw an interception on Auburn's ensuing possession, prompting the Tigers to insert true-Freshman backup QB Kodi Burns into the game on their next series. However, he also turned the ball over on his first possession. MSU capitalized on AU's turnovers by adding another Carlson field goal on the ensuing drive to stretch their lead to 13–0.

However, the Tigers mounted a comeback late in the second quarter, when RB Ben Tate ran 28 yards to finally put Auburn on the board. On the ensuing kickoff, MSU KR Derek Pegues fumbled the return, giving AU the ball on State's 30-yard line with 4:12 to play in the first half. After turning the ball over on so many previous possessions, Auburn stuck to their ground game, not attempting a single pass during the ensuing series. Kodi Burns led the way for the Tigers, accounting for five of his team's seven carries and 21 of AU's 30 yards on the drive, capped by his one-yard dive into the endzone to tie the game, with K Wes Byrum's successful Extra point giving the Tigers a 13–14 lead, which they held for the remainder of the first half.

Neither team's offense was able to successfully move the ball in the second half until MSU took possession on AU's 44-yard line with 10:42 left in the fourth quarter, after S Demario Bobo intercepted a Kodi Burns pass.

The ensuing drive was the most important of the game for the Bulldogs, as they marched 44 yards in 10 plays and scored after using over five minutes off of the game clock. MSU RB Christian Ducré, who gained 21 yards on three carries on the drive, punched the ball into the endzone from five yards out for the score. The Bulldogs unsuccessfully attempted a two-point conversion, which left them with a narrow 19–14 lead with over five minutes remaining in the game. Brandon Cox returned to the game on the ensuing drive for Auburn. Cox led his team 67 yards down the field, all the way to MSU 9-yard line, but was unable to score as his fourth down pass attempt fell incomplete, giving State the ball back with just :48 remaining, allowing the 'Dogs to run out the clock and earn their first victory over an SEC opponent in 2007.

Auburn ended the game with 16 first downs to State's 14 and 110 more yards of total offense than MSU, but turnovers proved to be the story of the game with just one for MSU compared to five for AU.

As a team, MSU completed just five (of 18) pass attempts for 41 yards, but was able to rely on a powerful running game. RB Anthony Dixon was State's workhorse, finishing with 29 carries for 103 yards, while Christian Ducré contributed 63 yards on ten carries in addition to the game-winning touchdown for the Bulldogs.

Bulldogs' P Blake McAdams quietly posted an impressive performance by punting 6 times for an average of 43.3 yards, including a booming career-best 73-yard kick.

Five different Bulldog players recovered each of Auburn's turnovers: DE Jimmie Holmes and DT Kyle Love both recovered fumbles, while CB Anthony Johnson, SS Demario Bobo and FS Derek Pegues each intercepted AU passes. MSU LB Dominic Douglas again led all tacklers for the second time in his young (three-game) MSU career, with nine total.

After their slow 1–2 start, Auburn won their next four games, finished the season 9–4 by defeating Clemson in the Chick-fil-A Bowl, and were ranked 14th in the country in the final Coaches poll.

Gardner–Webb
Last Meeting: First Meeting

South Carolina
Last Meeting: August 31, 2006, L 0–15Series Record: Tied 6–6

UAB
Last Meeting: September 23, 2006, W 16–10 (OT)Series Record: Tied 1–1

Tennessee
Last Meeting: November 15, 2003, L 21–59Series Record: MSU trails 15–26–1

West Virginia
Last Meeting: October 7, 2006, L 14–42Series Record: MSU trails 0–1

Kentucky
Last Meeting: October 28, 2006, L 31–34Series Record: MSU trails 14–20

Alabama
Last Meeting: November 4, 2006, W 24–16Series Record: MSU trails 17–71–3

Arkansas
Last Meeting: November 18, 2006, L 14–28Series Record: MSU trails 5–11–1

Mississippi (Egg Bowl)
Last Meeting: November 25, 2006, L 17–20Series Record: MSU trails 38–59–6

Central Florida (Liberty Bowl)
Last Meeting: October 25, 1997, W 35–28Series Record: MSU leads 1–0

Awards and honors

Roster

  indicates players who are currently inactive during their redshirt season; Freshmen who are in their first season of active participation after redshirting are listed as "RS Fr."

Coaching staff

References

Mississippi State
Mississippi State Bulldogs football seasons
Liberty Bowl champion seasons
Mississippi State Bulldogs football